Haul trucks are off-highway, rigid dump trucks specifically engineered for use in high-production mining and heavy-duty construction environments. Haul trucks are also used for transporting construction equipment from job site to job site. Some are multi-axle in order to support the equipment that is being hauled.

Description
Most haul trucks have a two-axle design, but two well-known models from the 1970s, the 350T Terex Titan and 235T Wabco 3200/B, had three axles.

A good example of this is the Caterpillar 775 (rated at ). Quarry operations are typically smaller than, say, a gold/copper mine, and require smaller trucks.

Ultra class

The largest, highest-payload-capacity haul trucks are referred to as ultra class trucks. , the BelAZ 75710 has the highest payload capacity, .

Rear-eject

A rear-eject configuration is an alternative haul truck body style. Instead of lifting the bed vertically, the hydraulic cylinder pushes a ram-face horizontally through the body to eject the hauled load.

Rear-eject dump vehicles were first introduced in the 1980s by LeRoy Hagenbuch, P.E. of Philippi-Hagenbuch, Inc., for a refuse hauling application in New York City. They were designed to work on Volvo BM truck chassis. While the functionality of the ejector bodies worked well, they were prone to maintenance issues and not replicated until the 1990s. The next documented ejector bodies were developed by DDT, a UK truck manufacturer.  A variation using steel chains instead of a hydraulic ram was introduced by Bell, but did not become popular.

Caterpillar Inc. began offering a rear-eject option using technology originally designed for its scrapers after one of its contractors successfully converted a few CAT D400 models. The new design, installed on the company's D400E model, was less likely to jam in cold weather. CAT later began manufacturing a standard R.E. body for its 730, 740, and 740B articulating haul-truck series.

Philippi-Hagenbuch, a company specializing in truck body design, developed its own mechanism for its rear-eject bodies, and has patented its design in the US, Europe and Australia. The company customizes Rear-Eject bodies or trailers for several manufacturers' off-highway vehicles; including both rigid and articulating varieties.

As of 2014 Caterpillar Inc. and Philippi-Hagenbuch, Inc. are continuing to manufacture Rear-Eject bodies for off-highway applications, each using its own design of mechanism.

Rear-eject vs. end-dump 
Because rear-eject bodies do not lift, or move externally in any way, they maintain a lower center of gravity.  This means more stability on uneven terrain where the truck might tip over during the dump process.  The truck can also be driven while dumping is in progress; this reduces subsequent time and effort spent on grading the dumped material.

Rear-ejects are typically better suited to completely eject sticky material, preventing "carry-back."

A rear-eject truck can deliver a load in an area with a low overhead barrier.

Notable examples

See also

 Articulated hauler
 Dumper
Haul road
Rear-eject haul truck bodies
Unit Rig

Notes

References

 

ru:Самосвал#Внедорожные (карьерные) самосвалы